The NW type E is a veteran automobile manufactured by Nesselsdorfer Wagenbau-Fabriks-Gesellschaft A.G. (NW, now known as Tatra).

The car was able to reach speed of 90 km/h.

References

Cars of the Czech Republic
NW E
Cars introduced in 1904
Veteran vehicles
Front mid-engine, rear-wheel-drive vehicles